Introduction is the third studio album by guitarist Marty Friedman, released on November 8, 1994, through Shrapnel Records (United States) and Roadrunner Records (Europe), one week after his band Megadeth released Youthanasia. It is also the second album to feature Megadeth bandmate Nick Menza on drums. It was also a family affair, with Nick's father Don Menza playing shakuhachi.

Critical reception

Robert Taylor at AllMusic gave Introduction 4.5 stars out of 5, calling it "An unexpected masterpiece in a genre that could use more releases such as this." The album was described as having built on the formula set out in Friedman's previous album, Scenes (1992), but "with more maturity and musical diversity. Themes are not just introduced and abandoned in favor of gratuitous technical noodling, rather the compositions are thoughtfully explored and brought to a natural conclusion."

Track listing

Personnel
Marty Friedman – guitar, bass, arrangement, production
Brian BecVar – keyboard, piano, additional sound replacement
Nick Menza – drums
Alex Wilkinson – additional orchestration
Sachi McHenry – cello
Charlie Bisharat – violin
Don Menza – shakuhachi
Steve Fontano – engineering
Alex Wilkinson – engineering, production
Jared Johnson – engineering
Seth Cooperrider – engineering
Kenneth K. Lee, Jr. – mastering
Mike Varney – executive production

References

External links
Story Behind The Song - Introduction at martyfriedman.com
In Review: Marty Friedman "Introduction" at Guitar Nine Records

Marty Friedman albums
1994 albums
Shrapnel Records albums
Roadrunner Records albums
Albums produced by Mike Varney